Skotisma Zazavavy eto Madagasikara is the national Guiding federation of Madagascar. It serves 25,152 members (as of 2008). Founded in 1941, the federation became a full member of the World Association of Girl Guides and Girl Scouts in 1963.

Members of the federation are
 Fanilon'i Madagasikara (Catholic, girls only)
 Kiadin'i Madagasikara - Eclaireuses et Eclaireurs de Madagascar (interreligious, coeducational)
 Mpanazava sy Tily eto Madagasikara - Eclaireuses et Eclaireurs Unionistes de Madagascar (Protestant Unionist Guides and Scouts of Madagascar, coeducational)

The two latter organizations are also members of the Firaisan'ny Skotisma eto Madagasikara, the national Scouting federation, which is a member of the World Organization of the Scout Movement.

See also
Firaisan'ny Skotisma eto Madagasikara
Scouting and guiding in Madagascar

References

World Association of Girl Guides and Girl Scouts member organizations
Scouting and Guiding in Madagascar
Youth organizations established in 1941